The Daily Campus, founded in 1896, is a student-run newspaper at the University of Connecticut that has a circulation of 2,000 on weekdays during school term. The Daily Campus has the largest circulation of any college paper in Connecticut and the third-largest in New England, behind The Daily Collegian (UMass) and The Harvard Crimson (Harvard University). Since its creation, the newspaper has undergone several name changes, having starting as The Storrs Agricultural College Lookout, a monthly, when it published its first issue on May 11, 1896. The name was changed to The Connecticut Campus in 1915, followed by The Connecticut Daily Campus, and then finally The Daily Campus in 1984. It began publishing five days a week during the academic year in 1952 and became a morning paper in 1955.

The newspaper's offices are located at The Daily Campus Building at 1266 Storrs Road in Storrs, Connecticut. The paper was previously located across campus at 121 North Eagleville Road, but moved to the current location in 1991/1992. Though originally addressed at 11 Dog Lane, the building was re-addressed as 1266 Storrs Road in the spring of 2012 to accommodate the new buildings being constructed alongside the building as part of the new Storrs Center. 

The building is located at the south entrance to campus, across the street from the Fine Arts Building, and adjacent to Buckley Residence Hall. The two-story building houses the business staff and front desk on the bottom floor, and the newsroom and conference room on the second. The editor-in-chief, managing editor and associate managing editor have offices on the second floor, while the business manager's office is located on the first.

The newspaper features four main sections: News, Opinion, Life and Sports. Each section has its own department run by an editor and associate editor. There is also a photography department, which provides student-shot pictures for every section. The photographers are managed by both a photo editor and associate editor. A circulation manager plans the delivery routes and manages these student-drivers in the circulation department. In addition, the paper employs an advertising director, financial manager, business manager, a digital editor, and an associate digital editor. 

Students of all majors are encouraged to join the staff.

News 
The news section covers campus news, including breaking news, administrative decisions, investigative stories and clubs and organization's like the Undergraduate Student Government. It also covers local, state and national issues as they relate to UConn.

The Daily Campus won the College Media Association award for Best News Delivery for its coverage of controversial speaker Lucian Wintrich, who was arrested when he came to speak at the university in November 2017.

In December 2005, when controversial conservative commentator Ann Coulter visited UConn at the invitation of the College Republicans, The Daily Campus was granted the only one-on-one interview with Coulter and was the only outlet with pictures from inside the theater. No other media outlets were allowed inside. The speech itself was marked by protests on campus and alternative "hate free" events, and was cut short after about 15 minutes when a prank recording of a clip from the TV show South Park was played over the loudspeakers.

Opinion 

The opinion section, which features columnists as well as the letters to the editor. The commentary section is always located on page 4 of the first section of the paper.

Opinion features a selection of weekly columnists, usually three, who have written for the paper for a few years. Each weekly columnist writes one featured column a week. The Opinion Editor and Associate Editor typically write a featured column weekly as well, meaning there is one featured column on each weekday, also published in the section are columns by staff columnists, who write on a semi-regular basis. All manner of topics are discussed in Opinion, both local and national. Notable weekly columnists include Owen Silverman and Dan Stark.  

Opinion also publishes a short daily editorial that is considered the official opinion of The Daily Campus. It has been featured on the left side of page 4 in recent years. The Daily Campus editorial board, composed of the opinion editors, weekly columnists and editor-in-chief, meet weekly in order to determine the editorials for the coming week. A disclaimer was added below the editorial in 2003 following an incident in which 9,000 copies of the paper were stolen after a controversial column was published in opinion (see Controversies below). The disclaimer states that only the editorial is the official opinion of the paper, while the columns are the opinions of the columnist and columnist alone.  

In 2014 the opinion section had to retract and issue an apology for a piece entitled "On sexual assault, risk of overreacting."  The piece was, reportedly, never supposed to be released and was only printed due to "distractions."  The story came in response to the university's handling of several sexual assault cases and the national trend of universities across the country endorsing affirmative consent for all sexual activity.  The piece expresses the opinion that affirmative consent is not always practical or viable if both parties had been drinking.
 
The opinion section no longer includes the following features:  

 Instant Daily was started in 2003 by then Commentary Editor Dan Maxwell. Instant Daily received hundreds of instant messages per day with a select few (about a half-dozen) being chosen for publication by the editors. Most submissions were comical observations of campus life, though tributes (such as ones following the 2007 Virginia Tech shooting), remembrances (often following student deaths) and topical issues are also discussed. Instant Daily has received criticism for being an anonymous forum where students can make hurtful comments without fear of repercussions. 
 Husky Talk is a sidebar which features a question that is answered by a handful of students on campus. The respondents' photos are published next to their answers. The questions and answers run the gamut from serious to sarcastic to relatively inane. 
 Other features include a Quick Wit (a humorous quote-of-the-day) and an editorial cartoon. Various features, including a "This Day in History" element, were once included in Commentary but have either been moved to other parts of the paper or removed altogether.

Comics 

The comics section runs one page long, usually on page 5 across from the opinion section. It is not a part of Opinion or the News department, however. 

The section also runs a daily crossword puzzle, horoscopes and a sudoku puzzle.

Life 

The Life Department covers performances, entertainment and style on campus. It regularly features reviews of on campus events, such as concerts, plays and guest lectures. The Life Department is credentialed for all on-campus events, including performances at the J. Louis von der Mehden Recital Hall and Jorgensen Center for the Performing Arts. It also covers the annual Spring Weekend concert, held at Gampel Pavilion, and has featured artists such as Kendrick Lamar and Steve Aoki in 2013, Wiz Khalifa in 2012 and others including Busta Rhymes, Guster, O.A.R., 50 Cent and Nas in recent years. Life regularly includes features and weekly columns about matters of interest to students such as sexual health, relationships, academics, employment, and entertainment. 

Each day of the week, page 8 is a "Focus on" page with a set theme: television, movies, video games, music and lifestyle. Each day the column, reviews, features and sidebar elements on page 8 (often carrying over to page 9) fit that theme. These sidebar elements include a list of upcoming shows (music), highest ranked video games (video games), most watched shows (television) and upcoming releases (movies), as well as a staff-chosen show, album, movie, video game or app of the week. 

Life is on the front page of the second section of The Daily Campus. It shares the same section as Sports, which starts on the back page. The first three pages of Life are almost always in full color.

Sports 

The Sports Department, staffed by approximately 20 writers, is credentialed to all on-campus and several off-campus UConn sporting events.  

The department covers as many sports as its staffing level allows. It always covers men's basketball, women's basketball and football. It also has regular beat writers for men's and women's soccer, field hockey, men's and women's ice hockey, lacrosse, baseball, softball, men's and women's tennis, men's and women's track/cross country, men's and women's swimming & diving, golf, rowing and club sports. When staff allows, many sports will have two beat writers. Basketball and football always have multiple beat writers. 

The budget for the Sports Department is the highest of any of the sections. This allows beat writers to travel to important away games and tournaments, especially for the larger sports such as basketball and football. Writers have covered the men's and women's basketball teams throughout the NCAA tournament, from Washington D.C. to San Antonio, Texas; Tampa, Florida; Charlotte, North Carolina; Phoenix, Arizona and Fresno, California. Beat writers reported on location at all 10 of UConn's basketball titles - men's (1999, 2004 and 2011) and women's (1995, 2000, 2002-2004, 2009-2010). A writer also traveled to the Maui Invitational in 2005, which UConn won. Two beat writers were sent to Detroit for UConn's first bowl game in football, the 2004 Motor City Bowl, as well as UConn's bowl appearance in the 2007 Meineke Car Care Bowl. Following the UConn football team's Big East championship in 2010, three reporters were sent to Glendale, Arizona to report on the school's first BCS bowl appearance in the 2011 Fiesta Bowl, in which UConn was defeated by heavily favored Oklahoma. The Daily Campus published a special extra for the Motor City Bowl victory over Toledo, as well as the Maui Invitational title. 

The Daily Campus has covered sports since the start of publication, when the paper was still referred to as The Lookout. In the December 1900 issue of The Lookout, an editorial ran stating, "It is in the opinion of the students that basket ball could be introduced into our college sports." Basketball was indeed started at the school in 1901 and The Lookout covered the first game, writing, "It may be justly said that the first attempt at C.A.C. [Connecticut Agricultural College, as UConn was then known] at basket-ball was a success." The Lookout reported again, a year later, when the first women's basketball game was played, "The college girls started in with a vigor amazing to behold, and soon Miss Koons soon made a pretty throw into the basket from the field."

The Daily Campus Sports Department was involved in two national stories during the 2002-2003 school year. In November 2002,  sports columnist Matt Burke wrote a column titled "Memorial's goalposts must go." The UConn football team was closing out their season with a game against Kent State, and with a new, off campus, stadium opening the next year, Burke wrote, "I am imploring you, the student population, to tear down those goalposts at the conclusion of Saturday's football game, win or lose." UConn won the game, and when hundreds of students spilled on the field to take down the posts, police with attack dogs had encircled the goalposts. Students rushing the posts were pepper sprayed and beset by dogs. The one student to make it to the posts was handcuffed and taken into police custody. The violent incident made national headlines, and Burke's column, whether the impetus or not, was featured prominently, on shows such as ESPN's Pardon the Interruption.

The following spring The Daily Campus again made national headlines. The UConn women's basketball team had set a collegiate record for 70 straight victories before losing to Villanova on March 11, 2003 in the Big East championship. In the postgame press conference, a reporter from a New Jersey paper began by asking UConn head coach Geno Auriemma what he would do to make sure the loss did not linger through the NCAA tournament. After Auriemma answered the somewhat-blasphemous question with an equal amount of sarcasm, The Daily Campus beat writer Amanda Alnutt asked a similar follow-up question. 

 Alnutt: What are you going to do to make sure that it doesn't happen [again]?
 Auriemma: You ask a lot of questions that really piss me off. You're too young to ask those questions. Older guys can ask me questions that piss me off. You're too young. You see, this is just a f---ing game. It's not the end of the world. But every question you ask is like, 'We should cancel the season now because we lost.' Relax.
 Alnutt: You don't think you need to do anything to prepare your team for that? They just lost and now they have to go into the NCAA tournament?
 Auriemma: So what does every game have to do with the rest? We lost a game today. We just won 70 straight. Did that have anything to do with this one?

The clip was replayed on ESPN's SportsCenter repeatedly in the days following and was featured prominently on shows such as ESPN's Pardon the Interruption. Auriemma received plenty of criticism for his handling of the situation. Auriemma would later meet with Alnutt personally and apologize, and also wrote about the incident in his autobiography, remarking that he wished he had spoken to her privately instead of chastising her in front of the press.

Board shift 
In 2015 The Daily Campus switched to a board composed entirely of student voters, rather than the mixture of professionals (non-students) and students that have served on the board since the seventies.  The decision was made after the University threatened to take away funding from the paper and the editor-in-chief at the time, with student support, agreed to the university administration's demands, citing the over $300,000 in student fees the paper is dependent upon (which account for nearly 75% of the paper's total income).

Prior to the decision, the 9-person board consisted of 7 professionals and 2 students.  Before 2004 the board held 6 professionals.  The board structure introduced in 2015 consists of 7 voting, student board members and an additional 5-member, non-voting advisory board made up of professionals including at least one journalist, lawyer and finance/accounting professional.  

The board now consists of 11 voting student members. It is headed by the Editor-in-chief. Other board members are the Managing Editor, Associate Managing Editor, Digital Editor , Business Manager, Advertising Director, as well as five other members.

Photo and video 
The photo department provides photos to accompany stories for all sections of the paper.

Extras and more 

The paper also regularly publishes special extras, usually tabloid-style inserts of approximately eight to 12 pages. 

Focus Extras (called "Out of Focus") are often published in accordance with the seasons (Fall, Winter, Spring), but the most common extras are put out by the Sports Department. An annual Homecoming Football Extra is published prior to the team's homecoming game, while Basketball Extras are published for major rivalry games. Husky Hoopla, an annual basketball issue, is published around Midnight Madness every year and highlights the upcoming season for both men's and women's basketball.

The paper has also published special jackets (covering the entire paper) following basketball national championships, including full-color jackets on the consecutive days of April 6 and April 7, 2004 following UConn's unprecedented sweep of the men's and women's titles. Recently, the paper has published numerous jackets previewing or commemorating major events. Notable among these was a commemorative jacket published on the first anniversary of Jasper Howard's death and a jacket previewing the UConn football team's critical season finale against South Florida, a game that UConn would win on a late field goal to clinch the school's second Big East championship and first ever BCS Bowl berth. The paper has also published jackets previewing the outdoor hockey game played at Rentschler Field and several throughout the men's basketball team's run to the Big East and National Championship in 2011.

Students lay out the newspaper every Sunday through Thursday night using the program Adobe InDesign and can take anywhere from four to eight hours nightly to lay out the 14-18 pages of each issue.

The newspaper itself has often been in the news in recent years, with an editorial column calling for the resignation of UConn President Philip E. Austin in 2005 after construction problems arose in the building of various on-campus structures as part of the state of Connecticut's UCONN 2000 and 21st Century UConn projects. The building was also the site of the theft of computer equipment in August 2005, just days before the beginning of publication for the new school year.

Notable alumni

 Dan Drew, editor-in-chief, 2002; Mayor of Middletown, Connecticut
 Evan Skolnick, cartoonist, 1987-1988; Marvel Comics, Activision
 Leigh Montville, editor-in-chief, 1964-1965; bestselling author

Reference 

 4. https://collections.ctdigitalarchive.org/islandora/object/20002%3A860166993

 "100 Years of Women's Basketball" by Mark J. Roy, UConn Advance
https://opencommons.uconn.edu/dcamp/
http://www.courant.com/education/hc-daily-campus-board-reorganization-0131-20150220-story.html
http://www.courant.com/news/connecticut/hc-daily-campus-apology-1031-20141030-story.html

Daily Campus, The
Daily Campus, The
Daily Campus, The